Callia guyanensis is a species of beetle in the family Cerambycidae. It was described by Martins and Galileo in 2008. It is known from French Guiana.

References

Calliini
Beetles described in 2008